Telefomin Rural LLG is a local-level government (LLG) of Sandaun Province, Papua New Guinea. Mountain Ok languages are spoken in the LLG.

Wards
01. Amaromin
02. Fuiaimin
03. Bovripmin
04. Sogamin
05. Temsapmin
06. Abungkamin
07. Afogavip
08. Agamtauip
09. Anavip-Kalikman
10. Atemtkiakmin
11. Bofulmin/Tifalmin
12. Bogalmin
13. Drolengam
14. Famukin
15. Inantigin
16. Kialikman/Framen
17. Urapmin
18. Kobrenmin
19. Kobrenmin/Framin
20. Komdavip
21. Ofektaman
22. Okbilavip
23. Siliambil
24. Fumenavip
25. Wabia
26. Freda Base

See also
Telefol language
Telefol people

References

Local-level governments of Sandaun Province